

Studio albums

Live albums

Compilation albums

Music videos

Soundtracks

Discographies of American artists
Discographies of Russian artists
Rock music group discographies